BB13 may refer to:

Big Brother 13 (disambiguation), a television show 
, a United States Navy battleship